James Beckett may refer to:

 James Beckett (statistician), American statistician, former editor/publisher of Beckett Media
 James Beckett (politician) (1875–1938), Irish politician
 James Beckett (water polo) (1884–1971), Irish water polo player
 James Beckett (1912–1996), Northern Irish historian